Maloti or Maluti may refer to:

 Maluti, a small town in Dumka District, Jharkhand, India
 Maloti, Eastern Cape, a town in Alfred Nzo District Municipality, Eastern Cape province, South Africa
 The Maloti mountains in the highlands of Lesotho, also commonly spelled "Maluti". On the South African side of the range it is called the Drakensberg
 The plural of Lesotho loti, the currency of Lesotho